Nils Turesson Bielke (5 November 1569 – 17 December 1639) was a Swedish statesman, member of the privy council, son of Ture Pedersson Bielke.

Career 
Nils Turesson Bielke was an ardent supporter of Duke Carl which rewarded his fidelity in 1602 when he became Kansliråd, deputy director of the kingdom; in 1605 he became governor of Tallinn and its province, in 1606 member of privy council and in 1608 judge. In addition, both he and his brother Svante Turesson Bielke were raised to rank of barons.

Treaty of Knäred 
He was a Swedish delegate at the peace negotiations which preceded the peace of Knäred in the 1613 after the Kalmar War.

Judge 
In 1614 he became assessor of Svea Court of Appeal, based in Stockholm. In 1623 first president of Turku Appellate court and governor of Finland

Personal life 
In the 1605 Nils Turesson Bielke married Ingeborg Oxenstierna, they had eight sons:

 Ture Bielke (1606-1648)
 Sigrid Bielke (1607-1634) married count Åke Henriksson Tottiga (1598-1640)
 Christina Bielke (1609-1609)
 Carin Bielke (1612-1694) married in 1641 Axel Banériga (1594-1642)
 Gustaf Bielke (1618-1661)
 Svante Bileke (1620-1645)
 Brita Bielke (- -1669) married in Stockholm Gustaf Banériga (1618-1689)
 Sten Bielke

|-

Swedish nobility
Members of the Privy Council of Sweden
Swedish diplomats
17th-century Swedish politicians
1569 births
1639 deaths
17th-century Finnish people
Swedish Governors-General of Finland